A Converted British Family Sheltering a Christian Missionary from the Persecution of the Druids is a painting by William Holman Hunt that was exhibited at the Royal Academy in 1850 and is now in the Ashmolean Museum in Oxford. It was a companion to John Everett Millais's Christ in the House of His Parents. Both artists sought to depict similar episodes from very early Christian history, portraying families helping an injured individual. Both also stressed the primitivism of the scene.

Subject
Hunt's painting depicts a family of ancient Britons occupying a crudely constructed hut by the riverside. They are attending to a missionary who is hiding from a mob of pagan British Celts. A Druid is visible in the background on the left pointing towards another missionary, who is being taken by one of the mob.

A stone circle is noticeable behind the missionary but is visible only through gaps in the back of the hut used by the Christian family. The contrast between Christian and Druidic symbols is identified by the painting of a red cross over a stone within the Christian family's hut.

The presence of the druid presumably locates the intended period of the scene before the Roman conquest of Britain in the mid-1st century, making the missionaries very early ones indeed, although the vestment-like clothes that they wear would, even to the well-informed Victorian, suggest a much later period.

Reception

Hunt's painting was less controversial than Millais's companion piece, but Hunt was still heavily criticised for the odd composition and the contorted poses of the figures. In 1860, Florence Claxton's painting The Choice of Paris: An Idyll parodied the composition of Hunt's picture along with other works by the Pre-Raphaelite artists of the previous years.

Hunt himself continued to believe it to be one of his best works. In 1872, referring to the painting as "the Early Xtians", he wrote in a letter to Edward Lear, stating that "sometimes when I look at the Early Xtians I feel rather ashamed that I have got no further than later years have brought me, but the truth is that at twenty – health, enthusiasm and yet unpunished confidence in oneself carries a man very near his ultimate length of tether".

Notes

External links
Typological Symbolism in Hunt's Major Works

1850 paintings
Paintings by William Holman Hunt
Paintings in the collection of the Ashmolean Museum
Paintings of children
Works about missionaries